Lebetimonas acidiphila is a thermophilic, acidophilic, hydrogen-oxidizing and motile bacterium from the genus of Lebetimonas. To observe growth there temperature should be between 30 and 68 degrees Celsius.

References

Bacteria genera
Bacteria described in 2005
Campylobacterota